Ukun Rukaendi (born 15 January 1970) is an Indonesian para badminton player. He played in the men singles SL3 event of the 2020 Summer Paralympics.

Awards and nominations

Achievements

World Championships 
Men's singles

Men's doubles

Asian Para Games 

Men's singles

Men's doubles

Asian Championships 

Men's doubles

ASEAN Para Games 

Men's singles

Men's doubles

BWF Para Badminton World Circuit (1 title, 2 runners-up) 

The BWF Para Badminton World Circuit – Grade 2, Level 1, 2 and 3 tournaments has been sanctioned by the  Badminton World Federation from 2022. 

Men's singles 

Men's doubles

International Tournaments (7 titles, 5 runners-up) 
Men's singles

Men's doubles

References

1970 births
Living people
People from Garut
Paralympic badminton players of Indonesia
Badminton players at the 2020 Summer Paralympics
Indonesian male badminton players
Indonesian para-badminton players

External links
 Ukun Rukaendi at BWFpara.tournamentsoftware.com

Notes